Sevarios Kuriakose (born 21 May 1959) is a Syriac Orthodox bishop, currently Archbishop of the Knanaya Jacobite Archdiocese.

Education
Mor Sevarios Kuriakose has Post graduation in History from CMS College Kottayam and Post graduation in English from St. Berchmans College. He joined Maynooth University in Ireland for degree in theological studies.  Later he obtained Post graduation in theology from Pourasthya Vidya Peeth Vadavathoor.

References

Syriac Orthodox Church bishops
Indian Oriental Orthodox Christians
1959 births
Living people
Christian clergy from Kottayam